Marianna of Austria may refer to:
Mariana of Austria, Queen of Spain
Maria Anna of Austria, Queen of Portugal